Zabalius is a genus of bush crickets or katydids in the subfamily Pseudophyllinae. Its distribution is essentially Afrotropical. They are generally heavily built, tree-dwelling herbivorous katydids, capable of flight.

Species 
The Orthoptera Species File includes:
Zabalius albifasciatus (Karsch, 1896)
Zabalius apicalis (Bolívar, 1886)
Zabalius aridus (Walker, 1869)
Zabalius centralis Beier, 1957
Zabalius congicus Beier, 1954
Zabalius girardi Beier, 1973
Zabalius lineolatus (Stål, 1873) - type species (as Mustius guineensis Bolívar)
Zabalius ophthalmicus (Walker, 1869)
Zabalius robustus Beier, 1954
Zabalius verruculosus (Pictet & Saussure, 1892)

References

Pseudophyllinae
Orthoptera of Africa
Tettigoniidae genera
Taxa named by Ignacio Bolívar